Portunus haanii (swimming crab, red swimming crab, red swimmer crab, or warty swimming crab) is a species of crab.  It is a source of commercial crab meat in Vietnam and China.

References

Portunoidea
Marine fauna of East Asia
Marine fauna of Australia